Kwai Chung is an urban area within Tsuen Wan New Town in the New Territories of Hong Kong. Together with Tsing Yi Island, it is part of the Kwai Tsing District of Hong Kong. It is also part of Tsuen Wan New Town.

In 2000, it had a population of 287,000. Its area is 9.93 km². Areas within Kwai Chung include: Kwai Fong, Kwai Hing, Lai King, Tai Wo Hau. Kwai Chung is the site of part of the container port of Hong Kong.

Origin of the name
In earlier times Kwai Chung was called Kwai Chung Tsai. Kwai Chung was a creek (Chung) that emptied into Gin Drinkers Bay. The whole bay was reclaimed for land and the creek is no longer visible.

Divisions
Traditionally, Kwai Chung is divided into Sheung Kwai Chung, and Ha Kwai Chung. Administratively, the former is called North Kwai Chung, and the latter South Kwai Chung.

Sheung Kwai Chung, Chung Kwai Chung Village and Ha Kwai Chung Village are recognized villages under the New Territories Small House Policy.

Economy
Kwai Chung is the home of the principal commercial cargo handling area of Hong Kong, the Kwai Chung Container Terminal, one of the largest and busiest port facilities in the world. The main commercial port was relocated here from Yau Ma Tei in the 1980s, in preparation for the West Kowloon Reclamation, which has left the original waterfront of Yau Ma Tei almost half a mile inland.

The area has the head office of Kerry Logistics.

Education
Lutheran School for the Deaf is in Kwai Chung.
S.T.F.A. Lee Shau Kee College

Sheung Kwai Chung and Chung Kwai Chung (Upper and Central Kwai Chung) are in Primary One Admission (POA) School Net 64, which includes multiple aided schools (schools operated independently of the government but funded with government money); none of the schools in the net are government schools.

Ha Kwai Chung (Lower Kwai Chung) is in Primary One Admission (POA) School Net 65, which includes multiple aided schools (schools operated independently of the government but funded with government money); none of the schools in the net are government schools.

See also
List of places in Hong Kong
Public housing estates in Kwai Chung
Hulu Concept, a not-for-profit cultural organisation based in Kwai Chung

References

External links

Satellite view of the container port in Kwai Chung
 Delineation of area of existing village Sheung Kwai Chung (Tsuen Wan) for election of resident representative (2019 to 2022)
 Delineation of area of existing village Chung Kwai Chung (Tsuen Wan) for election of resident representative (2019 to 2022)
 Delineation of area of existing village Ha Kwai Chung (Tsuen Wan) for election of resident representative (2019 to 2022)

 
Populated waterside places
Port cities and towns in China